Eschweilera roraimensis is a species of woody plant in the family Lecythidaceae. It is found in Brazil and Venezuela. It is a canopy tree, found in cloud forest in the Sierra Parima between 700 and 1,500 meters elevation. It is threatened by habitat loss.

References

roraimensis
Flora of Brazil
Flora of Venezuela
Vulnerable plants
Taxonomy articles created by Polbot
Flora of the Tepuis